The American Dairy Science Association (ADSA) is a non-profit professional organization for the advancement of dairy science. ADSA is headquartered in Champaign, Illinois.

Consisting of 4500 members, ADSA is involved in research, education, and industry relations. Areas of ADSA focus include:
 care and nutrition of dairy animals;
 management, economics and marketing of dairy farms and product manufacturing;
 sanitation throughout the dairy industry; and,
 processing of dairy-based products, including processing and foods manufacturing (milk, cheese, yogurt, and ice cream).

ADSA's top priorities are the Journal of Dairy Science, annual meetings, scientific liaisons with other organizations and agencies, and international development. ADSA is attempting to add value to potential new members through an emphasis on "integration of dairy disciplines from the farm to the table."

History
In the summer of 1905, the Graduate School of Agriculture was held at Ohio State University. Professor Wilber J. Fraser of the University of Illinois at Urbana-Champaign suggested a permanent "Dairy Instructors and Investigators Association". Attendees decided that Professor Fraser should discuss the matter further with university leaders and, if enough interest was indicated, call an organizational meeting at the 1906 Graduate School of Agriculture to be held at the University of Illinois, Urbana. Apparently, sufficient interest was raised, because Professor Fraser called interested parties to attend an inaugural meeting on July 17, 1906. Although 19 persons appear on the photograph of that first meeting, records indicate only 17 or 18 charter members joined what was then called "National Association of Dairy Instructors and Investigators". At this time, dairy schools existed at Cornell, Iowa State, Wisconsin, Purdue, Penn State, Ohio State, Missouri, Minnesota, Guelph (Ontario), and Illinois.

The second meeting was at the National Dairy Show in Chicago on 11 Oct 1907. Only 11 members were present when the meeting was called to order and 21 attended the banquet. At this meeting, the name of the organization changed to "Official Dairy Instructors Association".

The third meeting, held July 22 and 23, 1908 at Cornell University, was a significant success. 69 persons from Canada, 26 states, and the District of Columbia attended. By this time, the committees had become cohesive engines of change, developing score cards for consistently evaluating dairies and rules for judging contests.

At the 10th annual joint meeting in Amherst and Springfield, Massachusetts, on October 17, 1916, the organization voted to change its name to its current name. The name change was effective May 1, 1917.

By 1945, ADSA had 1,407 members. By 1985, ADSA had 3,000 members in fifty countries, owned a headquarters building with a staff of nineteen, provided management services for six other organizations, and published the Journal of Dairy Science and five journals for other organizations. FASS Inc., which was founded in 1998, currently provides association management services to ADSA and other clients.

From 1927 to 1997, ADSA held its annual meetings on college campuses. Since 1998, ADSA has held its annual meetings in convention centers.

Journal of Dairy Science
ADSA's scientific journal is the Journal of Dairy Science (JDS). Volume I, Number 1 appeared on May 1, 1917 (also the effective birth date of the association's current name). Initially publishing bimonthly, JDS began monthly publication in 1934 and remains so today. JDS is among the top five most-cited scientific journals in the agriculture category.

Editors
 Jennie Pryce, quantitative geneticist, a previous section editor

Presidents
Former presidents of the association include:

 1907 Raymond A. Pearson
 1909 Clarence H. Eckles
 1911 Otto F. Hunziker
 1913 Julius H. Frandsen
 1915 Fred R. Rasmussen
 1917 William A. Stocking
 1919 A. Crosby Anderson
 1920 Martin Mortensen
 1922 Clarence H. Eckles
 1924 Andrew A. Borland
 1926 O. E. Reed
 1927 J. B. Fitch
 1929 G. C. White
 1930 J. M. Sherman
 1931 H. B. Ellenberger
 1932 E. L. Anthony
 1933 H. C. Jackson
 1934 R. B. Stoltz
 1935 C. L. Roadhouse
 1936 H. A. Ruehe
 1937 R. R. Graves
 1938 H. W. Gregory
 1939 E. Weaver
 1940 E. S. Guthrie
 1941 H. W. Cave
 1942 H. F. Judkins
 1943 H. P. Davis
 1944 Arthur C. Dahlberg
 1945 A. C. Ragsdale
 1946 J. A. Nelson
 1947 F. Ely
 1948 P. H. Tracy
 1949 W. E. Petersen
 1950 G. Malcolm Trout
 1951 R. B. Becker
 1952 H. A. Bendixen
 1953 H. B. Henderson
 1954 W. V. Price
 1955 L. A. Moore
 1956 I. A. Gould
 1957 C. F. Huffman
 1958 D. V. Josephson
 1959 K. L. Turk
 1960 A. C. Fay
 1961 R. E. Hodgson
 1962 E. L. Jack
 1963 I. W. Rupel
 1964 S. T. Coulter
 1965 G. H. Wise
 1966 F. E. Nelson
 1967 R. Albrectsen
 1968 W. M. Roberts
 1969 R. E. Erb
 1970 V. H. Nielsen
 1971 J. K. Loosli
 1972 H. E. Calbert
 1973 N. L. Jacobson
 1974 E. N. Boyd
 1975 J. E. Legates
 1976 L. G. Harmon
 1977 R. P. Niedermeier
 1978 W. L. Dunkley
 1979 T. H. Blosser
 1980 G. A. Muck
 1981 J. R. Campbell
 1982 J. H. Martin
 1983 L. H. Schultz
 1984 R. T. Marshall
 1985 B. R. Baumgardt
 1986 N. F. Olson
 1987 D. L. Bath
 1988 G. H. Richardson
 1989 H. H. Van Horn
 1990 R. L. Sellars
 1991 N. A. Jorgensen
 1992 S. E. Gilliland
 1993 J. H. Clark
 1994 W. E. Sandine
 1995 R. W. Hemken
 1996 R. L. Richter
 1997 L. D. Satter
 1998 C. H. White
 1999 L. D. Muller
 2000 H. E. Swaisgood
 2001 D. J. Schingoethe
 2002 J. C. Bruhn
 2003 D. K. Beede
 2004 J. A. O’Donnell
 2005 M. F. Hutjens
 2006 D. M. Barbano
 2007 G. F. Hartnell
 2008 M. A. Drake
 2009 D. C. Beitz
 2010 P. S. Tong
 2011 J. G. Linn
 2012 R. F. Roberts
 2013 R. K. McGuffey
 2014 S. A. Rankin
 2015 A. F. Kertz
 2016 S. Duncan
 2017 L. Armentano
 2018 K. Schmidt

Members
 Henry Vernon Atherton, Professor of Animal Science at the University of Vermont and pioneer in the dairy industry
 Clarence H. Eckles - 2nd & 8th ASDA president, professor at Missouri & Minnesota, author
 Julius H. Frandsen - 1st editor of the JDS, ADSA president ('13-'14), professor at Idaho and UMass
 Wilber J. Fraser - Founder, professor at Illinois
 Theophilus L. Haeker, professor at Minnesota, developed feeding standard, pioneered cooperatives
 Otto F. Hunziker - 3rd ADSA president (1910–1911), professor at Purdue, author, international reputation
 Raymond A. Pearson - 1st ADSA president (1906–1907), professor at Cornell, president of Iowa State University
 Khem Shahani - Professor at University of Illinois, Ohio State University, and University of Nebraska, discovered the DDS-1 strain of Lactobacillus acidophilus
 G. Malcolm Trout - ADSA President (1950) and historian for 30 years, professor at the University of West Virginia and Michigan State University

References

External links
 American Dairy Science Association

Organizations established in 1906
American dairy organizations
Food technology organizations
Organizations based in Illinois
Agricultural research
1906 establishments in the United States